Ideological exclusion is a term referring to the practice of restricting foreigners from entry into a country for ideological purposes.

External links
 Ideological Exclusion. American Civil Liberties Union.

United States immigration law